10 Gracie Square, sometimes styled Ten Gracie Square is a 1930-31 pre-war "white glove" co-op building constructed in Art Deco style. It's located on East 84th Street on Manhattan's Upper East Side between East End Avenue and the FDR Drive. It is one of only 42 "good buildings" in Manhattan as designated by Tom Wolfe, and is known for its sixteen-room triplexes.

Prior to the construction of the FDR Drive, which eliminated its river access, the building once had a residents' only yacht mooring on the East River. Prior residents include: Brooke Astor, Frances Schreuder, Jean Stein, Madame Chiang Kai-shek and Gloria Vanderbilt.

References

Residential buildings completed in 1931
Upper East Side
Condominiums and housing cooperatives in Manhattan